Herby Nowe is a railway station serving the town of Herby, located north of the Upper Silesian Industrial Area, along the Polish Coal Trunk-Line, in the Lubliniec County of the Silesian Voivodeship. By the station, which was opened in 1926, there is a whole district of condominiums and houses, built for the workers of the Polish State Railways and their families. Less than 2 kilometers southwest lies its twin station Herby Stare, located along the Częstochowa - Lubliniec line. Both stations are connected with each other, due to a big line, built in 1926.

See also 
 Gmina Herby

External links 
 A webpage about Herby Nowe and Herby Stare junction

Railway stations in Poland opened in 1926
Railway stations in Silesian Voivodeship
Lubliniec County